Matthew David Swann (born 16 May 1989) is an Australian field hockey player. He plays for the Queensland Blades in the Australian Hockey League.  He is a member of the Australian men's national field hockey team, making his first cap in 2009.  He won a gold medal at the 2011 Men's Hockey Champions Trophy and a bronze medal the 2012 Summer Olympics.

Personal
Swann is from Queensland. He used to live in Herston, Queensland. He moved to Perth, Western Australia to spend more time with the national team.

Field hockey
Swann is a defender. Luke Doerner gave him a yellow headband that he wears at every match. He played junior hockey in Mackay, Queensland. He currently resides in Perth, Western Australia. The national team was aware of him when he was competing in junior hockey. He plays for the Queensland Blades in the Australian Hockey League. In 2010, he played in the final game of the season for his state team in the Australian Hockey League. He played for the team in the first round of the 2011 season.

National team
Swann won his first cap for the Kookaburras in 2009. He played in the Champions Trophy tournament that year when his team won a gold medal. He was a member of the national team in 2010. That year, he was a member of the team that finished first at the Hockey Champions Trophy. In 2009, he was a member of the national team during a five-game test series in Kuala Lumpur, Malaysia against Malaysia. In May 2011, he played in the Azlan Shah Cup for Australia.  The Cup featured teams from Pakistan, Malaysia, India, South Korea, Britain and New Zealand. He represented Australia at the Champions Trophy in New Zealand in 2011, where Australia won a gold medal for the fourth time in a row. In December 2011, he was named as one of twenty-eight players to be on the 2012 Summer Olympics Australian men's national training squad.  This squad will be narrowed in June 2012.  He trained with the team from 18 January to mid-March in Perth, Western Australia. In February during the training camp, he played in a four nations test series with the teams being the Kookaburras, Australia A Squad, the Netherlands and Argentina. He is one of several Queensland based players likely to play in a three-game test series to be played in Cairns, Queensland from 22 to 25 June against the New Zealand's Black Sticks. He was selected to play for the Kookaburras at the Olympic games in 2012, beating the United Kingdom in the Bronze medal match. At the 2012 Summer Olympics, he was part of the Australian team that won the bronze medal.

He was part of Australia's gold medal-winning team at the 2014 Commonwealth Games.

Recognition
In 2011, Swann was honoured by being named the Young Player of the Year by the International Hockey Federation. In 2011, he was named in the World All-Star Team.

References

External links
 
 
 
 

1989 births
Living people
Sportspeople from Mackay, Queensland
Australian male field hockey players
Male field hockey defenders
2010 Men's Hockey World Cup players
Field hockey players at the 2012 Summer Olympics
2014 Men's Hockey World Cup players
Field hockey players at the 2014 Commonwealth Games
Field hockey players at the 2016 Summer Olympics
2018 Men's Hockey World Cup players
Olympic field hockey players of Australia
Olympic bronze medalists for Australia
Olympic medalists in field hockey
Medalists at the 2012 Summer Olympics
Commonwealth Games medallists in field hockey
Commonwealth Games gold medallists for Australia
Hockey India League players
Sportsmen from Queensland
Medallists at the 2014 Commonwealth Games